Penthouse is the third album by American alternative rock band Luna. It was ranked the 99th best album of the 1990s by Rolling Stone.

Track listing
All music by Luna and lyrics by Dean Wareham, except where noted.
 "Chinatown" – 4:39
 "Sideshow by the Seashore" – 3:12
 "Moon Palace" – 3:46
 "Double Feature" – 4:27
 "23 Minutes in Brussels" – 6:40
 "Lost in Space" – 3:44
 "Rhythm King" – 3:16
 "Kalamazoo" – 6:26
 "Hedgehog" – 3:05
 "Freakin' and Peakin'" – 6:12
 "Bonnie and Clyde" – 5:27 (Serge Gainsbourg) (CD bonus track not featured on vinyl and cassette releases)

Personnel
Luna
 Dean Wareham – vocals, guitars
 Sean Eden – guitar
 Justin Harwood – bass guitar, Theremin on "Sideshow By the Seashore", Mellotron on "Lost in Space", string arrangements
 Stanley Demeski – drums, percussion, vibraphone on "Rhythm King" and "Kalamazoo"
with:
 Lætitia Sadier – vocals on "Bonnie and Clyde"
 Jane Scarpantoni – cello on "Moon Palace", string arrangements
 Tom Verlaine – electric 12-string guitar on "Moon Palace" and electric guitar on  "23 Minutes in Brussels"
 Matthew Buzzell – backing vocals on "Kalamazoo"

Production
 Pat McCarthy – Producer
 Mario Salvati – Producer
 Lou Sciancalepore – Assistant Engineer
 Dave Voigt – Assistant Engineer
 Susanne Dyer – Assistant Engineer
 Mastered by Greg Calbi

See also
Kalamazoo, Michigan

References

Luna (1990s American band) albums
1995 albums
Albums produced by Pat McCarthy (record producer)
Elektra Records albums